Llanars is a municipality in the Pyrenean comarca of Ripollès in Girona, Catalonia, Spain. The parish church is a Romanesque church: Sant Esteve de Llanars.

The village name is documented from the 1068, with the Llenars form.

References

External links
 
 Government data pages 

Municipalities in Ripollès
Populated places in Ripollès